In mathematics, in linear algebra, a Weyr canonical form (or, Weyr form or Weyr matrix) is a square matrix satisfying certain conditions. A square matrix is said to be in the Weyr canonical form if the matrix satisfies the conditions defining the Weyr canonical form. The Weyr form was discovered by the Czech mathematician Eduard Weyr in 1885.  The Weyr form did not become popular among mathematicians and it was overshadowed by the closely related, but distinct, canonical form known by the name Jordan canonical form. The Weyr form has been rediscovered several times since Weyr’s original discovery in 1885.  This form has been variously called as modified Jordan form, reordered Jordan form, second Jordan form, and H-form. The current terminology is credited to Shapiro who introduced it in a paper published in the American Mathematical Monthly in 1999.

Recently several applications have been found for the Weyr matrix. Of particular interest is an application of the Weyr matrix in the study of phylogenetic invariants in biomathematics.

Definitions

Basic Weyr matrix

Definition

A basic Weyr matrix with eigenvalue   is an  matrix  of the following form: There is a partition 
such that, when  is viewed as an   block matrix , where the  block   is an  matrix, the following three features are present:
 All other blocks of W are zero (that is,  when ).

In this case, we say that  has Weyr structure .

Example

The following is an example of a basic Weyr matrix.

So  has the Weyr structure . Also,

and

General Weyr matrix

Definition

We say that  is in Weyr form (or is a Weyr matrix) if   has the following form:

Example

The following image shows an example of a general Weyr matrix consisting of three basic Weyr matrix blocks. The basic Weyr matrix in the top-left corner has the structure (4,2,1) with eigenvalue 4, the middle block has structure (2,2,1,1) with eigenvalue -3 and the one in the lower-right corner has the structure (3, 2) with eigenvalue 0.

Relation between Weyr and Jordan forms

The Weyr canonical form  is related to the Jordan form  by a simple permutation  for each Weyr basic block as follows: The first index of each Weyr subblock forms the largest Jordan chain.  After crossing out these rows and columns, the first index of each new subblock forms the second largest Jordan chain, and so forth.

The Weyr form is canonical

That the Weyr form is a canonical form of a matrix is a consequence of the following result: Each square matrix  over an algebraically closed field is similar to a Weyr matrix  which is unique up to permutation of its basic blocks.

Computation of the Weyr canonical form

Reduction to the nilpotent case

Let  be a square matrix of order  over an algebraically closed field and let the distinct eigenvalues of  be . The Jordan–Chevalley decomposition theorem states that  is similar to a block diagonal matrix of the form

So the problem of reducing  to the Weyr form reduces to the problem of reducing the nilpotent matrices  to the Weyr form. This is leads to the generalized eigenspace decomposition theorem.

Reduction of a nilpotent matrix to the Weyr form

Given a nilpotent square matrix  of order  over an algebraically closed field , the following algorithm produces an invertible matrix  and a  Weyr matrix  such that .

Step 1

Let 

Step 2

 Form the matrix   consisting of these basis vectors.
 Compute .  is a square matrix of size   − nullity  .

Step 3

 Form the matrix   consisting of these basis vectors.
 Compute .  is a square matrix of size   − nullity   − nullity.

Step 4

Continue the processes of Steps 1 and 2 to obtain increasingly smaller square matrices   and associated invertible matrices  until the first zero matrix  is obtained.

Step 5

Step 6

 Compute the matrix  (here the 's are appropriately sized identity matrices).
 Compute .  is a matrix of the following form:

 .

Step 7

Use elementary row operations to find an invertible matrix  of appropriate size such that the product  is a matrix of the form .

Step 8

Set  diag  and compute .

Step 9

Find a matrix  formed as a product of elementary matrices such that  is  a matrix in which all the blocks above the block  contain only 's.

Step 10

Repeat Steps 8 and 9 on column  converting -block to  via conjugation by some invertible matrix . Use this  block to clear out the blocks above, via conjugation by a product   of elementary matrices.

Step 11

The resulting matrix  is now in Weyr form.

Step 12

Let    .     Then .

Applications of the Weyr form
Some well-known applications of the Weyr form are listed below:

 The Weyr form can be used to simplify the proof of Gerstenhaber’s Theorem which asserts that the subalgebra generated by two commuting  matrices has dimension at most . 
 A set of finite matrices is said to be approximately simultaneously diagonalizable if they can be perturbed to simultaneously diagonalizable matrices.  The Weyr form is used to prove approximate simultaneous diagonalizability of various classes of matrices.  The approximate simultaneous diagonalizability property has applications  in the study of phylogenetic invariants in biomathematics. 
 The Weyr form can be used to simplify the proofs of the irreducibility of the variety of all k-tuples of commuting complex matrices.

References

Linear algebra
Matrix theory
Matrix normal forms
Matrix decompositions